Wiman Joseon (194–108 BC) was an ancient Korean kingdom established after the fall of Gija Joseon.

See also 
 Wiman Joseon
 List of monarchs of Korea
 Gojoseon

Wiman Joseon
History of Korea